John Sadler (of Warmwell, Dorset) (18 August 1615 – April 1674) was an English lawyer, academic, Member of Parliament, Town Clerk of London, Hebraist, Neoplatonist and millenarian thinker, private secretary to Oliver Cromwell, and member of the Parliamentarian Council of State. He was Master of Magdalene College, Cambridge from 1650 to 1660.

Sadler was educated at Emmanuel College, Cambridge.

Family
He married Jane, daughter of the Dorset MP John Trenchard. His sister Ann married John Harvard.

In politics
He was nominated for Cambridgeshire for the 1653 Barebone's Parliament. In 1659, for the Third Protectorate Parliament, he was MP for Yarmouth, in the Isle of Wight.

Ernestine van der Wall writes:

The Hale Commission on law reform, headed from 1652 by Sir Matthew Hale, had Sadler as a leading lawyer, together with William Steele and John Fountain.

He was Town Clerk of London from 3 July 1649 (elected) to 18 September 1660. He was removed on the Restoration, under the pretext that he had signed the death warrant of Christopher Love. He was suspended 4 September 1660, then the suspension was removed on 6 September 1660 and finally he was "declared incapable of office" on 18 September 1660.

Political thought
He wrote The Rights of the Kingdom (1649), a founding document of British Israelitism. Tudor Parfitt calls it "one of the first invented expressions of an invented Israelite genealogy for the British". This was not, however, its overt purpose. Glen Burgess calls it "an historical defence of the regicide". Maurice Vile writes

Hartlib circle

Sadler was a philosemite, on friendly terms with Menasseh Ben Israel. He believed that readmission would allow for the Jews to be converted to Christianity, which would hasten the new millennium (which he conceived as being a time of "more justice and more mercy" rather than being visited by Christ's "bodily presence"). He was also an associate of Samuel Hartlib and John Dury. This interest was not clearly separated from the line taken by Sadler in The Rights of the Kingdom.

References

See also
 Ralph Crepyn, town clerk of London
 John Carpenter, town clerk of London
 John Monckton (town clerk)

Town Clerks of London
1615 births
1674 deaths
English lawyers
Alumni of Emmanuel College, Cambridge
Masters of Magdalene College, Cambridge
Members of Parliament for the Isle of Wight